Sarah + 2 is a 1962 studio album by American jazz singer Sarah Vaughan.

This was Vaughan's second album with just guitar and double bass accompaniment, following 1961's After Hours.

Reception

The Allmusic review by John Bush awarded the album three and a half stars and said that "The results are excellent, highlighting the power of Vaughan's voice, whether she's singing a rosy "All I Do Is Dream of You" or one of the most turgid torch songs, "All or Nothing at All." Her best feature is "When Sunny Gets Blue," a spotlight for her dynamic range.".

Track listing 
 "Just in Time" (Betty Comden, Adolph Green, Jule Styne) - 2:17
 "When Sunny Gets Blue" (Jack Segal, Marvin Fisher) - 3:48
 "All I Do Is Dream of You" (Nacio Herb Brown, Arthur Freed) - 2:54
 "I Understand" (Kim Gannon, Mabel Wayne) - 4:25
 "Goodnight Sweetheart" (Ray Noble, Jimmy Campbell, Reg Connelly) - 3:32
 "Baby, Won't You Please Come Home" (Charles Warfield, Clarence Williams) - 2:34
 "When Lights Are Low" (Benny Carter, Spencer Williams) - 2:55
 "Key Largo" (Carter, Karl Suessdorf, Leah Worth) - 3:26
 "Just Squeeze Me (But Please Don't Tease Me)" (Duke Ellington, Lee Gaines) - 3:10
 "All or Nothing at All" (Arthur Altman, Jack Lawrence) - 3:12
 "The Very Thought of You" (Noble) - 4:10

Personnel 
 Sarah Vaughan - vocal
 Barney Kessel - guitar
 Joe Comfort - double bass

References

1962 albums
Sarah Vaughan albums
Roulette Records albums
Albums produced by Voyle Gilmore